Darren Chalmers (born 26 June 1970) is a Canadian snowboarder. He competed in the men's giant slalom event at the 1998 Winter Olympics.

References

External links
 

1970 births
Living people
Canadian male snowboarders
Olympic snowboarders of Canada
Snowboarders at the 1998 Winter Olympics
Sportspeople from Vancouver